Session Man is a 1991 American short drama film directed by Seth Winston and starring James Remar. In 1992, it won an Oscar at the 64th Academy Awards for Best Short Subject.

Plot
An aging, but capable and talented session guitarist named McQueen (James Remar) is awakened by a late-night call from a nearby recording studio.  He is needed to help smooth out some tracks that are being worked on by an established and popular hard rock band, the Raging Kings.  The band’s own lead guitarist, Dean Storm (Jeff Kober) is resentful of McQueen’s involvement, and after an argument with the other members he decides to leave the group altogether.  Impressed by McQueen’s skills, the band asks him on the spot to replace Storm and he graciously accepts, fulfilling his lifelong dream.

After a brief jam session, Storm suddenly returns to the studio and asks to speak privately with the original band.  They soon return from the meeting, and one member comes to McQueen and reluctantly tells him that he is out. Stunned, McQueen manages to complete what he was called to do and returns home to his wife, who is still in bed.  She asks how it went, to which McQueen replies “Ok, just another session.”

Cast

 James Remar as McQueen
 Richard Aguilar as Parking Guard
 Erich Anderson as Peter Goffigon
 Teresa Crespo as Young woman
 Greg De Belles as Lee Fisher
 Michael Durrette as Leonard
 Bader Howar as Holly Mc Queen
 Robert Knepper as Torrey Cole
 Jeff Kober as Dean Storm
 Tito Larriva as Mouse
 Evan MacKenzie as Dabid Abrams
 Chris McCarty as Stuart
 Michael Harris as Chris Manning
 Henry G. Sanders as Louie
 Chad Smith as Spider Moore
 Lee Tergesen as Neal
 Elena Wohl as Darcy Vance (as Elena Stiteler)
 Carol Stoddard as Photographer (uncredited)

References

External links

Session Man in three parts each on YouTube

1991 films
1991 independent films
1991 short films
1991 drama films
American independent films
American rock music films
American drama short films
Films scored by Don Davis (composer)
Live Action Short Film Academy Award winners
1990s English-language films
1990s American films
English-language drama films